Hasanabad (also Romanized as Ḩasanābād) is a village in Jowshan Rural District, Golbaf District, Kerman County, Kerman Province, Iran. At the 2006 census, its population was 95, in 21 families.

References 

Populated places in Kerman County